A Scots Quair is a trilogy by the Scottish writer Lewis Grassic Gibbon, describing the life of Chris Guthrie, a woman from the north-east of Scotland during the early 20th century.

It consists of three novels: Sunset Song (1932), Cloud Howe (1933), and Grey Granite (1934).  The first is widely regarded as an important classic (voted Scotland's favourite book in a 2005 poll supported by the Scottish Book Trust and other organisations)  but opinions are more varied about the other two.

Sunset Song

The central character is a young woman, Chris Guthrie, growing up in a farming family in the fictional Estate of Kinraddie in The Mearns (Kincardineshire) in north-east Scotland at the start of the 20th century.  Life is hard, and her family is dysfunctional.  She marries a farmer, Ewan Tavendale, who dies in World War I.

Cloud Howe

Cloud Howe continues the story of Chris Guthrie. She marries for a second time to Robert Colquhoun, a Church of Scotland minister.  At the end of the novel, he dies in the pulpit while delivering a sermon.

Grey Granite

Grey Granite takes the story of Chris Guthrie further.  She moves to the fictional city of Duncairn (previously referred to in Cloud Howe as Dundon). In the Introduction, Gibbon points out that Dundon/Duncairn is based neither on Aberdeen nor on Dundee (as some reviewers had surmised) but is "merely the city which the inhabitants of The Mearns (not foreseeing my requirements in completing my trilogy) have hitherto failed to build".  An important character is her son by her first marriage, Ewan Tavendale, Jr., who becomes a left-wing political activist.

TV adaptations of all three works were made by the BBC in 1971, 1982 and 1983, respectively.  They were scripted by Bill Craig, and Vivien Heilbron played Chris.

References

External links
The Grassic Gibbon Centre

Novels by Lewis Grassic Gibbon
Novel series
1930s books
Novels set in Aberdeenshire
1930s in Scotland
Scots-language works